This is a list of notable actors from the Uzbek SSR and Uzbekistan.

(Persons are listed alphabetically by their first name.)

A
Aleksandr Abdulov
Ali Hamroyev
Alisher Uzoqov
Asal Shodiyeva
Akmal Nazarov

B
Baxtiyor Ixtiyorov

D
Dilnoza Kubayeva
 Diyor Mahkamov
 D.Ditto

E
Ergash Karimov

F
Feruza Jumaniyozova
Feruza Normatova

J
Jamshid Zokirov

L
Lola Yoʻldosheva

M
Melis Abzalov
Mömin Rizo

N
Nodirbek Primqulov

O
Otabek Mahkamov

R
Rayhon Gʻaniyeva
Ravshana Kurkova

S
Shahzoda
Sherali Joʻrayev
Shohruhxon
Shuhrat Abbosov
Shukur Burxonov
Sitora Farmonova

T
Tohir Sodiqov

U
Ulugʻbek Qodirov
Umid Iskandarov
Umid Irgashev

Y
Yefim Bronfman
Yoʻldosh Aʼzamov
Yulduz Usmonova

Z
Ziyoda Qobilova

See also
List of Uzbekistan films

 
Uzbekistan
Actors